"Do Something" is a song by American singer Macy Gray from her debut studio album, On How Life Is (1999). It was released on June 21, 1999, as the album's lead single.

Composition
The song samples OutKast's 1994 song "Git Up, Git Out" and Nice & Smooth's 1989 song "Funky for You".

Release
"Do Something" was released as two CD singles and a cassette single in the United Kingdom on June 21, 1999. One CD single contains remixes of "Do Something", including collaborators such as Cee-Lo of Goodie Mob along with a non-album track, "Rather Hazy". "Do Something" peaked at number 51 on the UK Singles Chart, her lowest-charting single on the chart to date. In the United States, the song failed to enter the Billboard Hot 100 but peaked at number 43 on the Hot Dance Singles Sales chart and number 63 on the Hot R&B/Hip-Hop Songs chart.

Music video
The music video for "Do Something" was directed by Mark Romanek, who had previously directed music videos for Fiona Apple and Michael Jackson. Released in 1999, the video depicts Gray in an all-white home, and surreal footage of people in the wilderness.

Accolades
Gray was nominated at the 42nd Grammy Awards for Best Female R&B Vocal Performance. The music video was nominated for two awards at the 2000 MTV Video Music Awards. Nigel Phelps was nominated for Best Art Direction in a Video, losing to the Red Hot Chili Peppers' "Californication". It won the award for Best Cinematography in a Video.

Track listing
UK CD single
 "Do Something" (Radio Edit) – 4:10
 "Rather Hazy" – 3:10
 "Do Something" (Organized Noize Mix featuring Cee-Lo) – 3:53

Charts

Release history

Media usage
"Do Something" was used in an MTV Europe commercial advertising summer festivals throughout Europe in 1999. The song was also used in the 1999 film Music of the Heart, and in an episode of music game show Idol.

References

1999 debut singles
1999 songs
Epic Records singles
Macy Gray songs
Music videos directed by Mark Romanek
Songs written by André 3000
Songs written by Bernie Worrell
Songs written by Big Boi
Songs written by CeeLo Green
Songs written by Darryl Swann
Songs written by Garry Shider
Songs written by George Clinton (funk musician)
Songs written by Jeremy Ruzumna
Songs written by Macy Gray